Ebb and Flow First Nation (Ojibwe: Gaa-gwekwekejiwang) is an Anishinaabe First Nations community in Manitoba. It is located on the eponymous Ebb and Flow Lake, northeast of Riding Mountain National Park. It is about 180 km from Winnipeg, and lies on the west side of Lake Manitoba, on Highway 278.

The reserve is known as Ebb and Flow 52, which is surrounded by the Rural Municipality of Alonsa.

See also 
 List of Indian reserves in Canada

References

External links
 Map of Ebb and Flow 52 at Statcan
Aboriginal Canada - Ebb and Flow First Nation

West Region Tribal Council
Ebb and Flow

First Nations in Central Manitoba
Anishinaabe communities in Canada